The Renault Premium is a heavy-duty truck that was produced by the French Manufacturer Renault Véhicules Industriels and later Renault Trucks (also part of Renault, now Volvo) from 1996 to 2013.

It was sold alongside the Renault Magnum as a slightly lower positioned alternative. There was also a version intended for lighter duty construction work called the Premium Lander, positioned beneath the heavy-duty Kerax. The Premium was mainly used as a distribution truck, competing with for example the DAF CF and Volvo FM.

Engines
At launch, the Premium was available with either a 9.8 or 11.1 6-cylinder diesel engine. Later Euro IV engines were sourced from parent company Volvo Trucks.

Premium Distribution

The Renault Premium Distribution is a transporter with a gross vehicle mass of 16 to 32 tonnes and a road tractor with a semi-trailer with a GVM of 40/44 tonnes, designed to replace the G range.

In September 2007, Renault Trucks presented the Hybris concept, a hybrid version based on this model.

In 2014, the standard models were replaced by the D range.

References

Print sources
 L'atlas des camions français, éditions Atlas, 2007 
 L'atlas les camions de légende, éditions Atlas, 2004

External links

Vehicles introduced in 1996
Cab over vehicles
Premium